Bam is a city and capital of Bam County, Kerman Province, Iran. As of 2016, its population is 127,396, an increase from 73,823 in 19,572 families ten years before.

The modern Iranian city of Bam surrounds the Bam citadel. Before the 2003 earthquake, the official population count of the city was roughly 43,000. There are various opinions about the date and reasons for the foundation of the citadel. Economically and commercially, Bam occupied a very important place in the region and was famous for its textiles and clothes. Ibn Hawqal (943–977), an Arab traveller and geographer, wrote of Bam in his book Surat-ul-'Ard (The Earth-figure):

Over there they weave excellent, beautiful and long-lasting cotton cloths which are sent to places all over the world. There, they also make excellent clothes, each of which costs around 30 dinars; these are sold in Khorasan, Iraq and Egypt.

History  
The ancient citadel of Arg-é Bam has a history dating back around 2,000 years ago, to the Parthian Empire (248 BC–224 AD), but most buildings were built during the Safavid dynasty. This citadel was a great tourist attraction for tourists and has been registered as a world heritage site in the United Nations Educational, Scientific and Cultural Organization. The city was largely abandoned due to an Afghan invasion led by Mahmud Hotak in 1722. Subsequently, after the city had gradually been re-settled, it was abandoned a second time due to an attack by invaders from Shiraz. It was also used for a time as an army barracks.

The modern city of Bam 
The modern city of Bam has gradually developed as an agricultural and industrial centre, and until the 2003 earthquake was experiencing rapid growth. In particular, the city is known for its dates and citrus fruit, irrigated by a substantial network of qanats.

One of the most important agricultural products is Bam Mozafati date, which is famous in Iran and other countries. Mozafati Bam dates with a delicate and rich taste, with a sweet melt and an amazing taste are harvested every year in Darbam in the mountainous region of Iran. No preservatives or chemical additives are added to it. It is a fresh, natural, raw and quality product.

The city also benefited from tourism, with an increasing number of people visiting the ancient citadel in recent years.

The earthquake destroyed and damaged much of the city and killed a large part of the population.  Since then, Bam has been in recovery.

2003 earthquake

The 2003 Bam earthquake struck Bam and the surrounding Kerman province of south-eastern Iran at 01:56 UTC (5:26 AM Iran Standard Time) on 26 December 2003. The most widely accepted estimate for the magnitude of the earthquake is 6.6 on the moment magnitude scale (Mw); estimated by the United States Geological Survey. The earthquake was particularly destructive, with the death toll amounting to 26,271 people and injuring an additional 30,000. The effects of the earthquake and damage was exacerbated by the fact that the city chiefly consisted of mud brick buildings, many of which did not comply with earthquake regulations set in Iran in 1989, and that most of the city's people were indoors and asleep.

Due to the earthquake, relations between the United States and Iran thawed. Following the earthquake the U.S. offered direct humanitarian assistance to Iran and in return the state promised to comply with an agreement with the International Atomic Energy Agency which supports greater monitoring of its nuclear interests. In total a reported 44 countries sent in personnel to assist in relief operations and 60 countries offered assistance and support.

Post-2003 development
Immediately following the 2003 earthquake, the Iranian government began to plan a new city based on population control theories in order to eliminate problems that existed with the old city. The development of the plan took at least six months and resulted in significant complaints against the central government and local government by the Bam earthquake survivors. Nevertheless, government in Tehran continued its plans and currently the city is being rebuilt. The citadel is also being rebuilt with specialist care from the Ministry of Culture and from Japanese universities. The earthquake was an extreme tragedy and stunted the growth of Bam as a city, especially as about half of the city's residents were killed and most of the remainder hurt. Costs of the earthquake mounted to between $700 million and $1 billion U.S. dollars.

Bam universities

Bam University 
Bam University is a prestigious academic institution that offers undergraduate courses in this university.

Bam University of Medical Sciences 
Bam Medical University is one of the most important universities in this city.

Islamic Azad University, Bam branch 
Islamic Azad University Bam branch, is considered one of the most prestigious universities in Bam.

Climate

Bam has a desert climate (Köppen climate classification BWh) with long, hot summers and mild, short winters. The average annual rainfall is around 60 mm.

On 16 March 2007 a 130 km/h (81 mph) sandstorm hit the city of Bam without warning, suffocating 3 children, killing 2 in car accidents, and wounding 14 others.

References

External links 

Travel magazine story on Bam as a tourist destination
Newspaper item: "The Lost Beauty that was Bam"
BBC story: "Bam: Jewel of Iranian heritage"
Population figures from World-Gazetteer.com
Digital Silk Roads Project – Citadel of Bam. Photos and movies
To Bam & back by Asghar Riahi

2003 earthquake
BBC news report
CNN news report
CNN report on rescue efforts
IRINNews.org "Special on Bam three months on"
IRINNews.org "Tehran lowers Bam earthquake toll"
ICOMOS Heritage at Risk 2004/2005: The Bam Earthquake
UNESCO World Heritage in Danger 2004 – Iran: Glimmers of hope in Bam

Earthquake reconstruction 
Reconstruction efforts in quake-devastated Bam continue two years on
Bam: Five Years After
Arg-e Bam – The BAM Citadel – Film Documentary:
Arg e Bam Movie Documentary – The BAM Citadel

Populated places in Bam County
Cities in Kerman Province
World Heritage Sites in Iran
Architecture in Iran
Populated places along the Silk Road
Cities destroyed by earthquakes